Hymenodora glacialis is a species of pelagic shrimp in the Acanthephyridae family. It is the only known species of pelagic shrimp to inhabit the Canada Basin.

References

Caridea
Crustaceans described in 1874